Balata may refer to:

West Bank
Balata village or Balata al-Balad, a suburb of Nablus, West Bank
Balata Camp, a Palestinian refugee camp in the West Bank
Tell Balata, an archaeological site on the West Bank

Other locations
Balata, French Guiana, a village in French Guiana
Balata, Iran, a village in Ilam Province, Iran
 Bălata, a village in Șoimuș Commune, Hunedoara County, Romania
Balata Garden, on Martinique

Plants
Mimusops balata, a flowering plant native to Mauritius and Réunion
Manilkara bidentata, known as balatá, a latex-producing tree native to the Americas